Aarveld is a Dutch neighbourhood of Heerlen, in the province of Dutch Limburg. On 1 January 2021, Aarveld had 1,180 inhabitants.

References

External links
  (Dutch)

Heerlen
Populated places in Limburg (Netherlands)